The College Park Skyhawks  are an American professional basketball team in the NBA G League based in College Park, Georgia, and are affiliated with the Atlanta Hawks.  The Skyhawks play their home games at Gateway Center Arena at College Park after the franchise played its first two seasons in Erie, Pennsylvania, at the Erie Insurance Arena as the Erie BayHawks. The team became the sixteenth D-League team to be owned by an NBA team.

History
On November 10, 2016, the Atlanta Hawks announced that they had bought and established a new NBA D-League team to play in a new arena in nearby College Park beginning with the 2019–20 season. In December 2016, the Orlando Magic purchased the original BayHawks franchise with the intent of relocating it to Florida for the 2017–18 season, eventually becoming the Lakeland Magic. In February 2017, the original BayHawks owners negotiated with the Atlanta Hawks to activate their franchise early and play as the BayHawks until the new arena in College Park is completed. The new Hawks' minor league franchise then became the BayHawks and began play in the rebranded NBA G League for the 2017–18 season.

The Hawks announced on February 21, 2019, that their G League affiliate would be known as the College Park Skyhawks when the team moved to Georgia for the 2019–20 season. On May 10, 2019, the Hawks announced that rapper and College Park native 2 Chainz would join the Skyhawks' ownership group.

Season-by-season

Current roster

Head coaches

NBA affiliates

Erie BayHawks (2017–19)
 Atlanta Hawks (2017–2019)

College Park Skyhawks
 Atlanta Hawks (2019–present)

References

External links
 College Park Skyhawks website

 
2016 establishments in Georgia (U.S. state)
Basketball teams established in 2016
College Park, Georgia